Michael Schwartz (1950 – February 3, 2013) was an American leader in the United States anti-abortion movement, a co-founder of the March for Life, and founding chairman of the Planned Parenthood watchdog organization Life Decisions International. He was a member of Operation Rescue and Chief of Staff to Senator Tom Coburn until 2000, and from 2004 to 2012. In November 2012, before Schwartz' death when he was no longer able to fulfill his duties because of his advancing illness, Senator Tom Coburn paid tribute to Schwartz on the Senate floor as "one of the kindest, gentlest people anyone has ever met."

In 1995 Schwartz was named executive director of the House Family Congressional Caucus. He also worked as a vice president for Concerned Women for America.

Activism
Michael Schwartz became a member of the Sons of Thunder (a name chosen in reference to the Gospel of Mark 3:14-19) at the University of Dallas in 1969. He traveled to DC from Texas with other members of the Sons of Thunder at the first Pro-Life March in Washington, DC on June 6, 1970. This activism was not initiated by Nellie Gray but by the brother-in-law of William F. Buckley and the founding editor of Triumph (magazine), a convert to the Roman Catholic faith, L. Brent Bozell Jr., who launched the magazine as the "Catholic version" of his brother-in-law's Conservative political publication the National Review.

When the US Catholic Bishops on April 22, 1970 officially avoided active leadership in dealing with the incremental legalization of abortion in CA, NY and DC, L. Brent Bozell Jr. announced that, as the Second Vatican Council or Vatican II had recommended, it was time for some of the laity to initiate serious Catholic Action, so Bozell scheduled his Catholic Action for June 6, 1970. Students, like Michael's group from Dallas, Triumph (magazine) staff and contributing writers, together with families and subscribers from the Washington Metro area, New England and various other States came to Washington, DC and met at St Stephen Catholic Church on Pennsylvania Avenue for Mass (liturgy), then gathered on George Washington Circle for a rally afterwards. Photos of the event included L. Brent Bozell Jr., Chris and Ann Bozell, Michael Schwartz and others at this Lay Catholic Action in front page headline and other news articles on June 6 and 7, 1970 in the Evening edition of The Washington Star and the Sunday edition of The Washington Post.

Biography
Michael Schwartz grew up in Philadelphia, poor and in family chaos: "My father was a drunken, adulterous wife beater. I remember my father beat the crap out of my mother frequently. He wanted me to meet his girlfriends. I started driving when I was seven. I took him to their homes. He became for me the permanent image of what I did not want to be. " This was the seedbed for what became a man of deep and abiding Faith: "I think I got all the breaks. I've had a very blessed life." His life's trajectory was likely set when one of his young friends gave him a copy of National Review. Until then, he didn't know he was a conservative. This led to Mike's becoming a charter subscriber to Triumph (magazine).

In 2011, Michael Schwartz was diagnosed with Lou Gehrig's Disease. He died in the company of his wife, children and grandchildren on February 3, 2013.

References

2013 deaths
1950 births
American anti-abortion activists
Deaths from motor neuron disease
Neurological disease deaths in the United States